Moshi Pradhikaran is a planned neighbourhood in the city of Pune, India. It hosts the International Convention & Exhibition Centre, Moshi High Street, The District Centre, Regional Transport Office, Safari Park, College of Engineering, Landscaped Gardens & Wide driveways.

It is accessible by Maharashtra State Road Transport Corporation buses and PMPML buses as well. It enjoys the benefits of good government infrastructure.

References 

Cities and towns in Pune district